The following is a timeline of the history of the city of Stuttgart, Germany.

Prior to 14th century

 1st C. CE - Roman fort established (Bad Cannstatt).
 950 CE - Old Castle built.
 1240 - Stiftskirche built.
 1300 - Counts of Württemberg establish residence (approximate date).

14th-18th century

 1321 - City status granted.
 1392 - Eberhard II, Count of Württemberg (1315–1392) dies in Stuttgart.
 1486 - Printing press in operation.
 1493 - Spitalkirche built.
 1495 - Stuttgart becomes capital of Wurttemberg.
 1570 - Old Palace built.
 1626 -  (cemetery) in use.
 1686 - Gymnasium illustre (school) established.
 1769 - Castle Solitude built outside city.
 1775 - Karlsschule relocates to Stuttgart.
 1795 - Population: 19,510.

19th century
 1803 - City becomes capital of the Electorate of Württemberg.
 1807 
 New Palace built.
 Schlossplatz opens.
 1808 - Schloss-Garten laid out in Neckar-Strasse.
 1810 - Royal Library founded by Frederick I of Württemberg.
 1811 - Stuttgart Cathedral rebuilding completed.
 1820 -  becomes mayor.
 1824 - Stuttgarter Liederkranz (singing society) founded.
 1826 - Natural history museum opens.
 1827 -  built.
 1829 - University of Stuttgart founded.
 1830 - Rosenstein Palace completed.
 1832 - Winterschule für Bauhandwerker (trade school) founded.
 1833 -  becomes mayor.
 1839 - Schiller memorial erected in Schillerplatz.
 1840 - Wilhelm Palais built.
 1841
 Schlossplatz column erected.
 Hospitalkirche restored.
 Population: 42,217.
 1842 -  founded.
 1843 - Staatsgalerie Stuttgart (art museum) opens.
 1846
 Railway station opens.
 Wilhelma garden established.
 1848 - Stuttgart-Heilbronn railway begins operating.
 1849 - Rump parliament held.
 1857
 Stuttgart Music School founded.
 Hotel Marquardt in business.
 Ploucquet's Museum opens.
 1860
 Königsbau constructed on the Schlossplatz.
 Population: 61,314.
 1861 -  built.
 1862 -  becomes mayor.
 1864 -  (concert hall) built.
 1865 - Polytechnic School built in Stadtgarten-Platz.
 1869 - Württemberg State Museum founded.
 1870 - Architectural school built.
 1871
 City becomes part of the German Empire.
  zoo in business.
 1872
 Black Forest Railway (Württemberg) in operation.
  becomes mayor.
 Stuttgarter Hofbräu brewery in business.
 1873 -  (cemetery) established.
 1875
 Martin's "Museum of the Primeval World" opens.
 Marienkirche built.
 1876 - Johanneskirche built.
 1880
 Wilhelma park opens to the public.
 Law Courts built.
 Population: 117,303.
 1881 - Breuninger retailer in business.
 Gewerbehalle built in Kriegsberg-Strasse.
 1888 - Dinkelacker brewery in business.
 1889 - Stuttgart Swimming Baths built.
 1890 - Population: 139,817.
 1892 - Socialist women's newspaper Die Gleichheit in publication in Stuttgart.
 1893 -  becomes mayor.
 1894 -  in business.
 1895 - Kriegsberg Tower, Landesgewerbe-Museum (industrial museum), and Königin-Olga-Bau constructed.
 1899 -  becomes mayor.
 1900
 German Peace Society headquartered in city.
 Friedrichsbau theatre opens.
 Stuttgarter Hymnus-Chorknaben (boys' choir) founded.
 Population: 176,699.

20th century

1900s-1945
 1901 - City public library established.
 1903 - Solituderennen motorsport events begin.
 1905
 Cannstatt and Untertürkheim become part of city.
 Population:249,443.
 1907 - International Socialist Congress held in Stuttgart.
 1908
 Degerloch becomes part of city.
 Cavalry barracks built.
 1910
  built.
 Population: 286,218.
 1911
 Linden Museum established.
  becomes mayor.
 1912
 Verein für Bewegungsspiele Stuttgart (football club) formed.
 Königliche Hoftheater and Stuttgart-Degerloch water tower built.
 1913 -  (cemetery) established.
 1915 - Böblingen Airport begins operating.
 1916 - Stuttgart Open tennis tournament begins.
 1918
 City becomes capital of Free People's State of Württemberg.
 Schlossplatz opens to the public.
 1919 - Population: 309,197.
 1922
 Botnang becomes part of city.
 Stuttgart Central Station rebuilt.
 Stuttgart Observatory active.
 1924 - Stuttgarter Philharmoniker (orchestra) formed.
 1927
 Weissenhof Estate built.
 Flandern military training ground active.
 1928 - Tagblatt-Turm and Schocken Department Store built.
 1931
 Rotenberg and Zuffenhausen become part of city.
 Ferdinand Porsche in business.
 1933
 Feuerbach and Weilimdorf become part of city.
 Karl Strölin becomes mayor.
 Adolf-Hitler-Kampfbahn (stadium) built.
 1935 - Max-Eyth-See (artificial lake) created.
 1937 - Kurmärker Kaserne (military barracks) built.
 1938
 Helenen Kaserne (military barracks) established.
  redesign adopted.
 1939
 Stuttgart Airport built.
 Horticultural exhibition held in Killesbergpark.
 Deportation of Jews begins.
 1940
 Robert-Bosch-Hospital opens.
 August 25: Aerial bombing by Allied forces begins.
 1942
 Plieningen and  become part of city.
 November 22: Aerial bombing.
 1943
 March 11: Aerial bombing.
 April 15: Aerial bombing.
 September 6: Aerial bombing.
 October 8: Aerial bombing.
 November 26: Aerial bombing.
 1944
 February 21: Aerial bombing.
 March 2: Aerial bombing.
 March 15: Aerial bombing.
 July: Aerial bombing.
 September: Aerial bombing.
 October 19: Aerial bombing.
 November 5: Aerial bombing.
 December 9: Aerial bombing.
 1945
 January 28: Aerial bombing.
 April 21: Allied ground forces take city; military occupation begins.
 December 5: United States Army occupies Kelley Barracks.
 Stuttgart Radio Symphony Orchestra and Volkstheater founded.
 Arnulf Klett becomes mayor.

1946-1990s
 1946 - Südfunk-Chor Stuttgart (choir) formed.
 1947 - Alte Staatsgalerie rebuilt.
 1948 - Bölkow aircraft manufactory in business.
 1952 - City becomes part of newly formed state of Baden-Württemberg.
 1953 - Landesarboretum Baden-Württemberg established.
 1954
  (water supply organization) founded.
 State Museum of Natural History exhibits open in Rosenstein Castle.
 1956 - Fernsehturm Stuttgart commissioned.
 1957 - Birkenkopf enlarged.
 1961 - City hosts Bundesgartenschau (national horticulture biennial).
 1964
 Stammheim Prison commissioned.
 New Palace reconstructed.
 1965
 Wilhelm Palais reconstructed.
 Railway Vehicle Preservation Company founded.
 1966 - Funkturm Stuttgart and Versatel building constructed.
 1967 - United States European Command headquarters relocates to Stuttgart.
 1969 - Old Castle renovated.
 1970 - Württembergische Landesbibliothek (state library) building opens.
 1971 - Georg von Holtzbrinck Publishing Group in business.
 1972 - Hannibal housing development and Fernmeldeturm constructed.
 1973 - Stuttgart (region) (Regierungsbezirk) established.
 1974 - Manfred Rommel becomes mayor.
 1975
 Trial of Red Army Faction members held in Stammheim Prison.
 Stuttgart-Möhringen directional radio tower built.
 1976
 Porsche Museum opens.
 Kickers-Stadium renovated.
 1978
 Stuttgart S-Bahn begins operating.
  founded.
 Roman Catholic Diocese of Rottenburg-Stuttgart active.
 1981 - Internationale Bachakademie Stuttgart founded.
 1982 -  begins.
 1983 - Hanns-Martin-Schleyer-Halle built.
 1984
 Neue Staatsgalerie (art museum) opens.
 Theaterhaus Stuttgart founded.
 1987 - Sparkassen Cup track and field competition begins.
 1988
 Schwanenbrau Cup cycling race begins.
 May: 1988 European Cup Final held.
 1997 - Wolfgang Schuster becomes mayor.
 2000 - Observation tower built in Killesbergpark.

21st century

 2005 - Kunstmuseum Stuttgart opens.
 2006 - Mercedes-Benz Museum opens.
 2007
 Messe Stuttgart (exhibition centre) built.
 United States Africa Command headquartered in Stuttgart.
 2011
 Population: 613,392.
 2013 - Fritz Kuhn becomes mayor.

See also

 Stuttgart history
 
 

Other cities in the state of Baden-Württemberg:(de)
 Timeline of Mannheim

References

This article incorporates information from the German Wikipedia.

Bibliography

in English

in German

External links

 
 Links to fulltext city directories for Stuttgart via Wikisource

 
Stuttgart